The Wannalancit Street Historic District is a historic district at 14-71 Wannalancit St., and 390, 406 Pawtucket Street in Lowell, Massachusetts.  This section of Wannalancit Street includes a remarkably well preserved and distinctive 19th century houses, representing a cross section of popular architectural styles of the period.  The most unusual house in the district is the round Jonathan Bowers House (built 1872); the oldest building is a c. 1853 vernacular Greek Revival cottage at 22 Wannalancit Street.

The district was listed on the National Register of Historic Places in 1998.

See also
National Register of Historic Places listings in Lowell, Massachusetts

References

Historic districts in Lowell, Massachusetts
National Register of Historic Places in Lowell, Massachusetts
Historic districts on the National Register of Historic Places in Massachusetts